Prince Senior first rank , son of Motosaki, was a kugyō or Japanese court noble of the late Edo period (1603–1868). He held a regent position kampaku from 1862 to 1863. His consort was Shimazu Kyoko, an adopted daughter of Shimazu Narioki, tenth head of Satsuma Domain. With her he had sons Tadafusa and Atsumaro, who was later adopted by Tadafusa as his son. He adopted a daughter of Shimazu Nariakira, named Atsuko or Atsuhime, who was a daughter of the Shimazu Imaizumi branch.  After adoption Atsuhime changed her name to Fujiwara no Fumiko, and later she became a consort of Tokugawa Iesada and took the name Tenshōin. Following the Meiji Restoration, he was granted the title of prince.

Honors
Translated from the article in the Japanese Wikipedia
Prince (1884)
Grand Cordon of the Order of the Rising Sun (March 1885)
Grand Cordon of the Order of the Rising Sun with Paulownia Flowers (26 September 1895)

Order of precedence
Senior fifth rank (26th day, second month of the 13th year of Bunka (1816))
Fourth rank (28th day, third month of the 13th year of Bunka (1816)
Senior fourth rank (28th day, 12th month of the 13th year of Bunka (1816))
Third rank (Seventh day, third month of the 14th year of Bunka (1817)
Senior third rank (11th day, eighth month of the fourth year of Bunsei (1821))
Second rank (16th day, third month of the sixth year of Bunsei (1823))
Senior second rank (Fourth day, sixth month of the seventh year of Bunsei (1824))
First rank (Fifth day, sixth month of the fifth year of Tenpo (1834), later entered Buddhist orders and was restored to the rank on the seventh day, sixth month of the second year of Bunkyu (1862))
Senior first rank (17 March 1904; posthumous)

References
 

1808 births
1898 deaths
Fujiwara clan
Kazoku
Konoe family